Dove Cay is an island in the Bahamas. It is located in the vicinity of Long Island, Bahamas. It is 1.07km long.

References

Islands of the Bahamas